Charles Babalola (born 1990 or 1991) is a British actor. He was educated at St Bonaventure's school in London and went on to study drama at Havering College and the London Academy of Music and Dramatic Art (LAMDA). Upon leaving LAMDA, he received the Alan Bates Award for graduating actors.

In 2016, he appeared in the film The Legend of Tarzan and in 2018 in Helen Edmundson's film Mary Magdalene as Andrew, one of Jesus's twelve disciples.

In 2018, Babalola finished a five-month run at London's Royal National Theatre production of Network, opposite Bryan Cranston.

In 2022, it was announced that he would lead the upcoming Showtime drama series King Shaka.

Selected filmography

Film

Television

References

External links
 

Living people
1990 births
Alumni of the London Academy of Music and Dramatic Art
Black British male actors
British people of Nigerian descent
People educated at St Bonaventure's Catholic School